The Promise of Chang'an is a 2019-20 Chinese television series directed by Yin Tao, starred by Cheng Yi, Zhao Yingzi, and Han Dong. It premiered in Tencent Video on 10 September 2020 until 5 November 2020 every Thursdays-Saturdays. Beside that, it also aired at Line TV, LiTV, and iQIYI Taiwan.

Plot
This series tells about the ups and downs of the Great Sheng Kingdom from its turbulence to prosperity under the regency of Helan Mingyu, the Empress Dowager Xianzhen.

Helan Mingyu (played by Zhao Yingzi) is a carefree, honest, bright but naive young lady who gets to know the 9th Prince Xiao Chengxu (played by Cheng Yi) by chance, which the two get along well and eventually develop feelings for each other. Chengxu repeatedly made military exploits to help his brother becomes the emperor and establish the Great Sheng Kingdom. However, the fate turns against them since Chengxu's younger brother, Chengxuan (played by Zhao Wenhao)'s life is depends on Mingyu's hand and she is forced to marry Xiao Chengrui (played by Han Dong), Chengxu's third brother after news about Chengxu's death are spread and trapped in the cruel Harem life.

When the truth behind the death of Chengxu's mother is exposed, Chengxu is determined to usurp the throne for take revenge, but Chengrui suddenly dies from his old illness after ordering Qiyuan (played by Zhao Dongze), his son with Mingyu to succeed the throne in order to contain Chengxu from rebel the throne. Chengxu then forced to assist Qiyuan until reach his majority while tries to revive his relationship with Mingyu. As the time passed, Qiyuan becomes dissatisfied with Chengxu controlling him and hates him more after find out about his uncle's affair with his mother.

Mingyu, the Empress Dowager Xianzhen, is now torn that the desires and needs of her people outweigh her own, forcing her to uses her wisdom to bring peace for her beloved person and the nation. However, Chengxu unexpectedly dies in the battle for protect Qiyuan and Qiyuan also passed away with his most favorite wife. For the sake of the Great Sheng's future, Mingyu once again must forget it all by accompanies her only living grandson in the throne.

Soundtrack

Production
Filming started on September 2018 and finished on 15 January 2019 at Hengdian World Studios.

Broadcast

Ratings (Hong Kong)

See also
Xiaozhuang Epic

References

External links

  .
 
The Promise of Chang'an on iQIYI.
The Promise of Chang'an on Line TV.
The Promise of Chang'an on WeTV.
The Promise of Chang'an on LiTV.
The Promise of Chang'an on Rakuten Viki .
The Promise of Chang'an on Amazon Prime Video .

Chinese historical television series
Chinese romance television series
Chinese drama television series
2020 Chinese television series debuts
2020 Chinese television series endings
Television series by H&R Century Pictures
Television series by Tencent Penguin Pictures